Seegebiet Mansfelder Land was a Verwaltungsgemeinschaft ("collective municipality") in the Mansfeld-Südharz district, in Saxony-Anhalt, Germany. It was situated between Eisleben and Halle (Saale). The seat of the Verwaltungsgemeinschaft was in Röblingen am See. It was disbanded on 1 January 2010.

The Verwaltungsgemeinschaft Seegebiet Mansfelder Land consisted of the following municipalities:

 Amsdorf
 Aseleben
 Dederstedt
 Erdeborn 
 Hornburg
 Lüttchendorf 
 Neehausen 
 Röblingen am See
 Seeburg 
 Stedten 
 Wansleben am See

References

Former Verwaltungsgemeinschaften in Saxony-Anhalt